Qadan Käbenuly (born March 1969) is a Chinese politician of Kazakh origin, currently serving as secretary-general of CPC Xinjiang Uygur Autonomous Region Committee, in office since October 2021. Previously he served as governor of Ili Kazakh Autonomous Prefecture and before that, governor of Altay Prefecture.

Biography
Qadan Käbenuly was born in Barköl Kazakh Autonomous County, Xinjiang, in March 1969. In 1988, he enrolled in Dalian University of Technology, majoring in organic chemicals. He joined the Communist Party of China (CPC) in October 2000.

After graduating in 1992, he joined the Xinjiang Chemical Design and Research Institute, where he was promoted to associate engineer in 1993 and to engineer in 1997. He served in the Xinjiang Uygur Autonomous Region Investment Company for a short while before assigning to the Enterprise Working Committee of Xinjiang Uygur Autonomous Region as an official in October 2000. In November 2004, he became director of Policies and Regulations Division of State Owned Assets Supervision and Administration Commission of Xinjiang Uygur Autonomous Region, a position he held until February 2012, when he was promoted to deputy director of the Economic and Information Technology Commission of Xinjiang Uygur Autonomous Region. In March 2016, he was appointed director of the Environmental Protection Department of Xinjiang Uygur Autonomous Region, but having held the position for only one year, then he took office as governor of Altay Prefecture. In April 2021, he was made governor of Ili Kazakh Autonomous Prefecture, succeeding Qurmaş Sırjanulı. In October 2021, he became secretary-general of CPC Xinjiang Uygur Autonomous Region Committee.

References

1969 births
Living people
People from Barköl Kazakh Autonomous County
Dalian University of Technology alumni
Ili Kazakh Autonomous Prefecture governors
People's Republic of China politicians from Xinjiang
Chinese Communist Party politicians from Xinjiang